"Stay (I Missed You)" is a song by American singer-songwriter Lisa Loeb. It was released in May 1994 as the lead single from the original movie soundtrack to Reality Bites (1994). The song was written and composed by Loeb herself, while production was handled by Juan Patiño. "Stay" was originally conceived in 1990, at one point with the intent of selling it to Daryl Hall for a project he was seeking music for. Upon deciding to use the song herself, Loeb's neighbor and friend, actor Ethan Hawke, heard the song and submitted it to Ben Stiller for use in the film he was directing, Reality Bites.  The song plays over the film's closing credits. Musically, "Stay" is a pop rock song that was also influenced by folk music. Lyrically, the song deals with a relationship that has recently ended, but the narrator is now regretful.

"Stay" received positive reviews from most music critics, who praised the lyrical and production side and the song's commercial potential. Several critics had listed the song in some of the best song lists. "Stay" ultimately went on to become a number-one hit on the Billboard Hot 100 chart, earning her the distinction of being the first artist to top the US chart before being signed to any record label. The song was commercially successful in several other countries, including Canada, where it also reached number one, and in Australia, New Zealand, and the United Kingdom. The song's music video was conceived, produced and directed by Hawke. For their performance of the song, Lisa Loeb and Nine Stories were nominated for a Grammy for Best Pop Performance by a Duo or Group with Vocals, but lost to All-4-One's "I Swear".

Background
Before "Stay" was commercially released, Loeb had previous musical ventures. After graduating from high school in 1986, she went to Brown University, where she graduated in 1990 with a degree in comparative literature. At Brown, she and Elizabeth Mitchell formed a band named Liz and Lisa, with future singer/songwriter and classmate Duncan Sheik as a guitarist. The duo released the albums Liz and Lisa (1989) and Liz and Lisa - Days Were Different (1990) independently. After college, bassist Rick Lassiter and TV and drummer Chad Fisher joined the band. After developing a following together, Loeb and Mitchell parted ways a few years after college. While talking about her past musical ventures, Loeb said; "When the song came out, though, I had been playing music since I was a little kid and I'd had gigs since high school, and I'd been making recordings for almost 10 years at that point. I didn't realize what an impact having a No. 1 single would have. It connects me with people of different ages, and I get to travel all over the world."

She attended Berklee School of Music in Boston for a session of summer school, and in 1990 formed a full band called Nine Stories. The band, which was named after the book by J. D. Salinger, included Tim Bright on guitar, Jonathan Feinberg on drums, and Joe Quigley on bass. Loeb began working with producer Juan Patiño to make the cassette Purple Tape in 1992. It included the earliest recordings of later popular tracks such as "Do You Sleep?," "Snow Day," "Train Songs," and "It's Over." Loeb sold the violet-colored cassette to fans at gigs and sent it to music industry promoters. Loeb and her band also made a recording of her song "Stay (I Missed You)" during the same time.  Loeb originally intended for the song to be used by Daryl Hall, whom she had heard was looking for songs for a solo project; before the song was finished, however, she had been told Hall no longer needed additional music.

Loeb was discovered by actor and friend Ethan Hawke, who lived in an apartment across the street from her in New York City. She met Hawke through mutual friends in the NYC theatre community.  Loeb had been performing "Stay (I Missed You)" to positive response at her shows, and Hawke gave a tape of Loeb's song to director Ben Stiller during the making of the film Reality Bites. Stiller subsequently agreed to use the song in the film and on the film's soundtrack.

The song was titled simply "Stay" on the Reality Bites soundtrack. As the single moved up the airplay charts, the title was changed to "Stay (I Missed You)" to avoid confusion with previous rock hits that had the same one-word name.

Composition and writing

Musically, "Stay" is a pop rock song with folk rock influence. Vocally, according to a publication, "The tonal shifts in the vocals also are quite affecting. Loeb rants and rails through much of the song with barely contained emotion only to pull back for some tenderness in the refrain. It’s an outstanding performance of an enduring song." The song is structured around a central passage of sonic catharsis. After the tentative opening, the pace and density of Loeb's roiling litany of self-recrimination increases; the personal pronouns pile up; the accents of the bass and backing voices grow unruly and insistent, like nagging, negative thoughts heaping on one another.

According to Rhik Samadder, Loeb's guitar picks out a simple arpeggio as she admonishes: "You say I only hear what I want to," warning us that this may be the most self-involved song ever written. Almost every line contains a clutch of first person singulars: "I turned the radio on, I turned the radio up, and this woman was singing my song." Based on the song's theme the break-up song is not about a relationship with a departed lover, but the relationship with ourselves [...] About accepting that our basic loneliness is unsophisticated and shared, and that we have to abandon the selfish dramas of our malaise to properly love. It's a point of emotional development [...]" Regarding the lyrical content, Loeb's explained; "I turned the radio on, I turned the radio up, and this woman was singing my song," Lisa explains: "That was when you hear somebody telling your exact story. It's funny, because it wasn't until later, after a couple of major breakups, that I realized when you're depressed and you're going through these breakups, the breakup was supposed to happen. If you're going through difficult times, it's hilarious how you turn on the radio and even the most cliché things perfectly capture how you're feeling. And then you realize why people wrote those songs."

According to Jim Beviglia of American Songwriter, "Loeb's lyrics definitely capture the breathless way of expressing oneself that was common at the time. Considering all of the lines that start with 'And,' the song can seem like one big run-on sentence. Yet in the midst of all of the breathlessness, she focuses enough to spin out several couplets that really nail the topsy-turvy feeling that romantic mind games can play on you."

Critical reception
"Stay (I Missed You)" was well received by music critics. Larry Flick of Billboard wrote: "Harmonic rock ballad from New York-based upstarts perfectly balances on the fine line between modern rock, AC, and top 40 pop sensibilities. With a vulnerable, determined delivery, Loeb's vocals recall the sweetness of the Sundays' Harriet Wheeler and the brashness of Edie Brickell." In the UK, Alan Jones from Music Week stated that "its pleasing amalgam of semi-acoustic stumming and sublime vocals is attractive enough to do rather well." Mark Surtherland in Smash Hits predicted UK chart success akin to that on the US charts, calling it "a rather touching acoustic ballad thingy in its own right. Just right for when you're feeling a bit angstful, and could be just as big here. In his retrospective review of the album Tails, Stephen Thomas Erlewine from AllMusic said: "Tails delivers on the promise of 'Stay'. While the basic folk-rock elements of the song are present, much of the material on the record doesn't sound like her breakthrough hit; there are some distorted guitars here and there, and she even rocks out a little bit. Nothing on Tails is as good as 'Stay'." In 2005, Erlewine wrote of the song in a review of The Very Best of Lisa Loeb. He said "'Stay (I Missed You)' took her from obscurity to minor celebrity when it was included on the soundtrack of Reality Bites [...] While Loeb never strayed very far from the sweet, gentle template she laid down with 'Stay (I Missed You),' she always was friendly, melodic, and rather ingratiating."

Almost twenty years after the release of Reality Bites, Jim Beviglia from American Songwriter wrote: "What [Reality Bites] did yield was a song that not only succinctly summed up that era but also managed to transcend it [...] Lisa Loeb's 'Stay (I Missed You)' is not just the relic of a specific era. It still resonates with anyone who ever loved someone not mature enough to properly reciprocate." Rhik Samadder from The Guardian centered the song in an "Old Music" article, praising the song saying: "Listening to the song now is like looking into a crystal ball backwards, seeing myself looking into it forwards. For that convoluted and dubious reason, whenever I hear Stay, I always turn the radio up."

Recognition
Charles Aaron from Spin ranked "Stay" number 20 in his list of the "Top 20 Singles of the Year" in December 1994. It later placed 93rd on VH1's "100 Greatest Songs of the 90's". The song was placed at number 100 on Entertainment Weeklys "The 100 Greatest Summer Songs", saying, "Every summer needs its lovelorn ballad along with its roof raisers, and Loeb's winsome plea fit the bill."

Loeb & Nine Stories received a Grammy nomination for Best Pop Performance by a Group, but lost to All-4-One's "I Swear." However, the group won a Brit Award for Best International Newcomer for the single.

Chart performance
After being featured in the film Reality Bites, "Stay (I Missed You)" entered the US Billboard Hot 100 in early April 1994. The song climbed the charts and eventually went to number one. Because of this, Loeb earned the distinction of being the first artist to top the US charts before being signed to any record label. For over 19 years, Loeb was the only artist to have this distinction, until the achievement was matched in 2013 by American duo Macklemore & Ryan Lewis with their single "Thrift Shop". "Stay (I Missed You)" held the number one position for three weeks, and stayed in the Hot 100 for an overall thirty weeks. It also reached number five on the Adult Contemporary chart, number seven on Modern Rock Tracks and number one on Top 40 Mainstream. The song was certified gold by the Recording Industry Association of America (RIAA) in July 1994 for the shipment of 500,000 copies. "Stay" ultimately sold 900,000 copies domestically.

The song debuted at number twenty-three on the New Zealand Singles Chart on 14 August 1994 and was the second highest-debuting single that week. The song peaked at fourteen in its third week and stayed for a total of thirteen weeks. The song debuted at number thirty-nine on the Australian Singles Chart on 7 August 1994. The song peaked inside the top ten in its fourth week and eventually peaked at number six for three consecutive weeks. The song stayed in the chart for a total of seventeen weeks. The single didn't have much success in Europe, but did debut at 27 on the UK Singles Chart. The song spent fifteen weeks on the chart and climbed to a peak of number six. The song was moderately successful in Europe, peaking at fifty-nine on the German Singles Chart, thirty-two on the Dutch Top 40, thirty-eight in Sweden and fifty in Belgium.

Music video
The music video, directed by Ethan Hawke and released in 1994, begins with a cat on a chair, then zooms out to Loeb (wearing a forest green dress and tortoiseshell glasses) singing the lyrics while walking around in the empty New York City apartment. No audio, visual or green screen effects were used through very basic and simple video. It has two continuous camera shots of Loeb in an apartment. Very near the end of the music video, the cat (which belonged to Hawke) reappears, this time sitting on a windowsill.

According to VH1 show Pop-Up Video, the video was filmed in just two separate takes.

Loeb's video was selected as the 1994 video of the year by Spin magazine.

Track listings
 US CD and cassette single "Stay (I Missed You)" – 3:04
 "Stay (I Missed You)" (living room mix) – 2:54

 UK, European, and Australian CD single "Stay (I Missed You)" (album version) – 3:04
 "Stay (I Missed You)" (living room mix) – 2:54
 "Stay (I Missed You)" (instrumental) – 3:00

Credits and personnel
Credits are taken from the US and UK CD single liner notes.Studios Mastered at Sterling Sound Studios (New York City)Musicians Lisa Loeb – writing, lead vocals, harmony vocals, acoustic guitars
 Elizabeth Mitchell – harmony vocals
 Juan Patiño – harmony vocals, production, engineering
 Tim Bright – electric guitar
 Daniel Littleton – electric guitar
 Joe Quigley – bass guitar
 Jonathan Feinberg – drums
 Steve Forman – percussionOther personnel'''
 Brian Malouf – mixing
 Steve Holroyd – additional engineering
 Ted Jensen – mastering
 Jacqueline Murphy – art direction
 Sean Smith – design
 Eduardo Patiño – photography
 Pamela Taylor – hair and make-up
 Tom Richmond – cat photo

Charts

Weekly charts

Year-end charts

Decade-end charts

Certifications

Cover versions
"Stay" was covered in 2006 by Filipino singer Chris Cayzer for his self-titled debut album. In 2007, it was covered by pop-punk band New Found Glory for From the Screen to Your Stereo Part II and featured Loeb on supporting vocals. Sarah Silverman performed a cover version of the song in the episode "I Thought My Dad Was Dead, But It Turns Out He's Not" from the second season of The Sarah Silverman Program. Two lines from the song ("You say I only hear what I want to/You say I talk so all the time") can be heard from Much has Been Said, a song by the Filipino rock band Bamboo from their album Light Peace Love''. 

The song was used in the movie, Hot Tub Time Machine 2, in 2015. It's a minor plot point, where Craig Robinson's character, Nick Webber, is revealed to have made his money by writing some of the best pop songs of the 90s (plagiarizing them using time travel) - this includes a poorly written version of Stay (I Missed You) complete with Webber recreating the video in place of Loeb. Loeb plays herself in the movie as a cat wrangler helping out on the set of the music video. 

In 2019, Loeb remade the song in collaboration with Canadian indie band Walk Off the Earth.

References

1990 songs
1994 debut singles
1990s ballads
Lisa Loeb songs
Bertelsmann Music Group singles
Billboard Hot 100 number-one singles
Pop ballads
RCA Records singles
RPM Top Singles number-one singles
Songs written by Lisa Loeb